"In the Heat of the Night" is the title of a boogie song by British trio Imagination. The single was released by R&B Records in 1982. The song also has appeared on their album In the Heat of the Night. The single reached number 22 on the British pop chart in 1982.

Track listing
UK 12" single
"In the Heat of the Night" – 5:18   
"In the Heat of the Night" (Instrumental) – 3:30

Production
In lieu of a normal bass line through conventional methods, this track showcases the Roland TB-303 bass synthesizer instead. This song serves as one of the few examples of the TB-303 being used for its designed purpose before being pushed into alternate timbres with the advent of acid house music years later.

Chart positions

References

1982 singles
Imagination (band) songs
Soul ballads
Songs written by Tony Swain (musician)
Songs written by Steve Jolley (songwriter)
1982 songs
Songs written by Ashley Ingram
Songs written by Leee John
Song recordings produced by Jolley & Swain